(also known as Paris, My Love) is a 1962 Italian comedy drama film directed by Vittorio Caprioli.

It was shown as part of a retrospective  at the 65th Venice International Film Festival.

Cast 
 Franca Valeri as Delia Nesti
 Vittorio Caprioli as Avallone
 Fiorenzo Fiorentini as Claudio Nesti
 Margherita Girelli as Grazia
  as Antonio
  as Elvira
 Gigi Reder as Il Portinaio

References

External links

1962 films
Commedia all'italiana
1962 comedy-drama films
Films directed by Vittorio Caprioli
Films set in Rome
Films set in Paris
Films shot in Rome
Films shot in Paris
Films scored by Fiorenzo Carpi
1960s Italian-language films
1960s Italian films